Veera Vijaya Bukka Raya ( Bukka Raya IV, Vijaya Raya) (1371–1426 CE) was an emperor of the Vijayanagara Empire of the Sangama Dynasty.

Veera Vijaya Bukka Raya was the son of Deva Raya I and succeeded his brother, Ramachandra Raya, in 1422 as the king of the Vijayanagara Empire. Similar to Ramachandra Raya, Vijaya Raya is not known for doing anything significant and his short reign ended in 1424 (though Fernao Nuniz had noted that his reign lasted six years) when he was succeeded by his son, Deva Raya II. Vijaya Raya was the second son of Deva Raya I.

External links
https://web.archive.org/web/20051219170139/http://www.aponline.gov.in/quick%20links/HIST-CULT/history_medieval.html
http://www.ourkarnataka.com/states/history/historyofkarnataka40.htm

1424 deaths
15th-century Indian monarchs
People of the Vijayanagara Empire
1422 births
Indian Hindus
Hindu monarchs
Sangama dynasty